Pseudopostega acidata is a moth of the family Opostegidae. It was described by Edward Meyrick in 1915. It is known from the Rio Grand Valley of southern Texas and southern Ecuador.

The length of the forewings is 2.7–4.1 mm. Adults have been recorded in June (in Ecuador) and from September to November (in southern Texas).

References

Opostegidae
Moths described in 1915